Bror Helge Gustafsson (16 January 1900 – 5 October 1981) was a Swedish gymnast who competed in the 1920 Summer Olympics. He was part of the Swedish team that won the gold medal in the Swedish system event.

References

1900 births
1981 deaths
Swedish male artistic gymnasts
Gymnasts at the 1920 Summer Olympics
Olympic gymnasts of Sweden
Olympic gold medalists for Sweden
Olympic medalists in gymnastics
Medalists at the 1920 Summer Olympics
Sportspeople from Örebro